John Wayne Mangum Jr. (born March 16, 1967) is an American former professional football player who played nine seasons in the National Football League (NFL) from 1990 to 1998 for the Chicago Bears. He played collegiately at Alabama and holds the career record for passes broken up (47).

Early life
John Wayne Mangum Jr. was born on March 16, 1967, in Magee, Mississippi. His father is John Mangum Sr. (1942-1994), a former football player best known as the defensive tackle for the Boston Patriots from 1966 to 1967. He is the brother of former NFL football player Kris Mangum, best known as the tight end for the Carolina Panthers from 1997 to 2006.

Professional career
Mangum was a sixth-round draft choice and played for the Chicago Bears between 1990 and 1998. He finished his Bears career with 272 tackles, 4.5 sacks, 5 interceptions, and 2 forced fumbles.

Personal
John Mangum currently works in Jackson, Mississippi, as a Senior Vice President and Financial Advisor for CapTrust independent investment advisor and asset management firm.  He is the father of three children: Bailey, Abbey and Jake.  His son Jake is an outfielder in the Miami Marlins organization.

References

1967 births
Living people
American football defensive backs
Alabama Crimson Tide football players
Chicago Bears players
People from Magee, Mississippi
Players of American football from Mississippi
Ed Block Courage Award recipients